Rečane may refer to:

, a village in Prizren Municipality
Rečane, Suva Reka, a village in Suva Reka Municipality
Rečane, Gostivar, a village in Gostivar Municipality, North Macedonia

See also
, a village in Toropetsky District, Tver Oblast, Russia
Rečani (disambiguation)